The 2010 Women's Premier Soccer League season is the 14th season of the WPSL.

Changes from 2009

Name changes

New franchises

Folding

Standings
End of 2010

Pacific Conference

North Division

South Division

Big Sky Conference

North Division

South Division

Sunshine Conference

Midwest Conference

North Division

South Division

East Conference

Central Division

Mid-Atlantic Division

Northeast Division

Playoffs

Eastern Conference

Big Sky Conference

Midwest/Sunshine Conferences

Pacific Conference

WPSL Championship

Composite top 16 bracket

References

External links
 WPSL standings

Women's Premier Soccer League seasons
2